Duftonia is a trilobite in the order Phacopida, that existed during the upper Ordovician in what is now England. It was described by Dean in 1959, and the type species is Duftonia lacunosa. The type locality was the Dufton Shale Formation, from which the generic name was derived.

References

External links
 Duftonia at the Paleobiology Database

Dalmanitidae
Fossil taxa described in 1959
Ordovician trilobites
Fossils of Great Britain